The 2009 WNBA Draft is the league's annual process for determining which teams receive the rights to negotiate with players entering the league. The draft was held on April 9, 2009. The first round was shown on ESPN2 (in HD for the first time ever) at 3:00pm ET, while the second and third rounds were shown on ESPNU and NBA TV at 4:00pm.

A lottery was held on December 9, 2008. The Atlanta Dream received the first overall selection of upcoming 2009 draft. The Washington Mystics received the number two selection. The Chicago Sky came up with the third overall selection, followed by the Minnesota Lynx at four, the Phoenix Mercury at number five. For the first time in WNBA history, the lottery balls were chosen exactly according to odds. Some of the top draftees were Angel McCoughtry, Marissa Coleman, Kristi Toliver, and Renee Montgomery.

Transactions
The Washington Mystics receive the first-round pick from the Los Angeles Sparks.
The Atlanta Dream receive the first-round pick from the San Antonio Silver Stars.
The San Antonio Silver Stars receive the second-round pick from the Atlanta Dream.
The Connecticut Sun and the Minnesota Lynx have rights to swap second-round picks.
The Washington Mystics receive the second-round pick from the Detroit Shock.
The Atlanta Dream receive the second-round pick from the Seattle Storm.
The Phoenix Mercury receive the third-round pick from the New York Liberty.
The Minnesota Lynx receive the first-round and second-round pick from the Washington Mystics
The Detroit Shock receive the second-round pick from the Atlanta Dream.

Key

Dispersal draft
On December 1, 2008, the league announced that the Houston Comets would no longer operate. On December 8, a dispersal draft was held with teams being allowed to pick based on reverse order of 2008 records.

College draft

Round 1

Round 2

Round 3

External links
Lynx trade Harding, the 23rd overall in 2009, and 2010 second round pick to the Mystics for the 9th and 15th overall picks in 2009
2009 WNBA Draft Board

References

Women's National Basketball Association Draft
Draft